In the taxonomy of microorganisms, Candidatus Methanoregula is a genus of the Methanomicrobiales. It was is isolated from an acidic peat bog.  It produces methane at the lowest pH of any known organism.

See also
 List of Archaea genera

References

Further reading

Scientific journals

Scientific books

Scientific databases

External links

Type strain of Methanoregula boonei at BacDive -  the Bacterial Diversity Metadatabase

Archaea genera
Euryarchaeota
Candidatus taxa